This is a partial list of baseball players who Olympic gold medalists and World Series champion, listing people who have won at least one  Olympic gold medal and World Series.

 Names in Bold denote people that have competed in the most recent the most recent Olympics, namely the 2020 Tokyo Summer Olympics or World Series, namely 2020 World Series.

Lists of Olympic gold medalists